Muangphe (autonym:) is a Lolo-Burmese language spoken by about 300 people in Guangnan County, Yunnan, China.

Distribution
Hsiu (2014) lists the following Muangphe villages. Xinfazhai (新发寨) has the most fluent speakers.

Heizhiguo Township (黑支果乡)
Mulang (木浪村)
Jilai (吉赖, pop. 137)
Xinfazhai (新发寨, pop. 233)
Yilang (夷郎村)
Mudilang (木底浪, pop. 150)
Xinjie (新街村)
Mulou (木娄, pop. 139)
Mulong (木聋, pop. 115)
Babao Township (八宝乡)
Yangliushu (杨柳树村)
Wabiao (瓦标, pop. 119)
Muliang (木良, pop. 113)

References

Mondzish languages
Languages of China